Infanta Maria José of Portugal (Maria José Joana Eulália Leopoldina Adelaide Isabel Carolina Micaela Rafaela Gabriela Francisca de Assis e de Paula Inês Sofia Joaquina Teresa Benedita Bernardina; 19 March 1857 – 11 March 1943), sometimes known in English as Maria Josepha, was a Portuguese infanta, later Duchess in Bavaria by marriage. She was the maternal grandmother of King Leopold III of Belgium.

Life 

Maria José was the fourth child and third daughter of King Miguel I of Portugal and his wife Adelaide of Löwenstein-Wertheim-Rosenberg. Among her sisters were Maria Ana, Grand Duchess of Luxemburg and Maria Antónia, Duchess of Parma. Her only brother was Miguel, Duke of Braganza.

On 29 April 1874 she married Karl Theodor, Duke in Bavaria, the younger brother of Empress Elisabeth of Austria.

The couple lived in Munich, where they founded the Herzog Carl Theodor Eye Clinic, that still exists today.
 
Maria José died in Vienna at the age of 85, and is buried in Tegernsee Abbey.

Children 
 Sophie Adelheid Ludovika Maria (1875–1957), married Count Hans Veit zu Törring-Jettenbach; their son married Princess Elizabeth of Greece and Denmark.
 Elisabeth Gabriele Valérie Marie (1876–1965), future Queen Elisabeth of Belgium, married Albert I of Belgium.
 Marie Gabrielle (1878–1912), married Rupprecht, Crown Prince of Bavaria.
 Ludwig Wilhelm (1884–1968), married  Princess Eleonore zu Sayn-Wittgenstein-Berleburg.
 Franz Joseph (1888–1912).

Ancestry

1857 births
1943 deaths
House of Braganza
Portuguese infantas
House of Wittelsbach
Duchesses in Bavaria
19th-century Portuguese people
19th-century Portuguese women
Dames of the Order of Saint Isabel
Daughters of kings